The 44th Edition Vuelta a España (Tour of Spain), a long-distance bicycle stage race and one of the 3 grand tours, was held from April 24 to May 15, 1989. The route was released on January 21, 1989.

Pedro Delgado had won the previous Tour de France and was seen as the favourite for the race. Delgado came with a Reynolds team that contained Miguel Indurain, who had just won Paris–Nice and was also seen as a potential favourite. The first few days of the race saw the leaders jersey change shoulders from Gino de Bakker, Benny van Brabant and Roland LeClercq. The Colombian Omar Hernández took the lead on the sixth stage. On the 12th stage to Cerler, Delgado battled with four Colombians and won the stage. He won the stage 15 time trial, where Colombian Martin Farfan took the leader's jersey. On the following stage to Santander, Delgado took the jersey. However Delgado's team had a bad day several stages later, when Indurain fell and broke his wrist; Delgado had difficulty keeping the jersey from Fabio Parra. Parra was only two seconds behind Delgado on the general classification at one stage. The final time trial was the last chance for Parra to try to take the jersey from Delgado, but Delgado won and increased his lead to win his third grand tour.

Route

Results

Final General Classification

References

External links 

 La Vuelta (Official site in Spanish, English, and French)

 
1989 in road cycling
1989
1989 in Spanish sport